William Jones is a novel by T. Rowland Hughes, written in 1944. It tells of the story of a quarryman in Gwynedd who decides to leave his community to look for work in the coal mines of South Wales. It describes the tough lives of the quarrymen at the beginning of the twentieth century.

A quote from the book, ”Cadw dy blydi chips!” (Welsh for "Keep your bloody chips!"), is probably the first time that a swear word appeared anywhere in modern Welsh literature.

1944 British novels
Novels set in Wales
Welsh-language novels